James Loyd Lewis was an American Negro league pitcher who played in the 1930s.

Lewis made his Negro leagues debut in 1936 with the Pittsburgh Crawfords. He played for Pittsburgh again the following season, then finished his career in 1938 with the Philadelphia Stars.

References

External links
 and Seamheads

Year of birth missing
Year of death missing
Philadelphia Stars players
Pittsburgh Crawfords players
Baseball pitchers
Baseball players from Los Angeles